Silvianthus is a genus of flowering plants in the family Carlemanniaceae, found in Bangladesh, the eastern Himalaya, south-central China, and Indochina. Thought to be in the order Lamiales, they have a chromosome count of 2n=38.

Species
Currently accepted species include:

Silvianthus bracteatus Hook.f.
Silvianthus tonkinensis (Gagnep.) Ridsdale

References

Lamiales genera